This is the discography of English singer-songwriter Steve Harley, including releases by Cockney Rebel and Steve Harley & Cockney Rebel.

Studio albums

Cockney Rebel

Steve Harley & Cockney Rebel

Steve Harley

Live albums

Compilations

Singles

As guest artist

Videography

See also
 List of songs recorded by Steve Harley

Notes

References

Rock music discographies
Discographies of British artists